Denis Walsh (10 February 1877 – 22 December 1952) was an Irish hurler.  His championship career with the Tipperary senior team spanned three decades years from 1895 until 1916.

Walsh first came to prominence on the inter-county scene at the age of 21 when he was selected for the Tipperary senior team. He made his debut during the delayed 1895 championship and quickly became a regular member of the team. In an inter-county career that spanned twenty years, Walsh won five All-Ireland medals, beginning with four championships in-a-row between 1895 and 1899 and ending with a fifth and final winners' medal in 1916.

Honours

Tipperary
All-Ireland Senior Hurling Championship (5): 1895, 1896, 1898, 1899, 1916
Munster Senior Hurling Championship (5): 1895, 1896, 1898, 1899, 1916

References

1877 births
1952 deaths
Tubberadora hurlers
Boherlahan-Dualla hurlers
Tipperary inter-county hurlers
All-Ireland Senior Hurling Championship winners